Gunwi County (Gunwi-gun) is a county in North Gyeongsang Province, South Korea.

Administrative divisions 

Gunwi County is divided into 1 eup and 7 myeon.

Climate
Gunwi has a humid continental climate (Köppen: Dwa), but can be considered a borderline humid subtropical climate (Köppen: Cwa) using the  isotherm.

References

External links
County government website

 
Counties of North Gyeongsang Province